Krautshäuptchen, also Krautshäubchen is a stuffed cabbage, a specialty of northern Hesse, Germany. It is served with boiled potatoes and mustard sauce or bechamel sauce. Often the Krautshäuptchen discs are fried until golden brown before serving in the pan.

See also
 List of stuffed dishes

External links
German Food Guide

Hessian cuisine
Stuffed dishes
North Hesse